Kayıp Armağan is a 2010 Turkish animated fantasy film directed by Kerem S. Hünal and written by Cemal Hünal. This film's storyline and the characters have been influenced by actual historical events, yet it consists of fictional characters, events and environments.

Story 
The Japanese Emperor Meiji wants Torajiro Yamada to bring a gift to the Ottoman Emperor Abdülhamid II. It is the symbol of the first diplomatic encounter between the two cultures. Torajiro Yamada's ship finally reaches the Aegean Sea after a long journey, but pirates attack the ship and steal the gift. Janissary Orhan and samurai Yamada start their bloody quest upon finding that on Ottoman soil.

References

External links
  

2010 films
2010 animated films
2010 fantasy films
2010s Turkish-language films
Turkish animated films
Turkish fantasy films
Films set in the Ottoman Empire